Lumiere v. Mae Edna Wilder, Inc., 261 U.S. 174 (1923), was a United States Supreme Court case in which the Court held a person or corporation cannot file suits under the Copyright Act in areas in which they do not have an office and do no business.

References

External links
 

1923 in United States case law
United States copyright case law
United States Supreme Court cases
United States Supreme Court cases of the Taft Court